Javier Pierre de Paepe (born 6 July 1990) is an Argentine badminton player. He educated architecture at the University of Buenos Aires, and participate at the 2015 Summer Universiade in Gwangju, South Korea.

Achievements

BWF International Challenge or Series 
Men's doubles

Mixed doubles

  BWF International Challenge tournament
  BWF International Series tournament
  BWF Future Series tournament

References

External links 
 

Living people
1990 births
Argentine male badminton players
20th-century Argentine people
21st-century Argentine people